The Great Saunter is a daylong hike that explores Manhattan’s 32-mile shoreline, visiting more than 20 parks and promenades of Manhattan Island. Manhattan's waterfront rim has evolved since Shorewalkers Inc., a nonprofit environmental and walking group, began fighting for a public shoreline walkway in 1982. Now the path is nearly contiguous. The Saunter takes place on the first Saturday in May, recognized by the NYC as Great Saunter Day.

The Great Saunter has received support from Bill de Blasio, Michael Bloomberg and other mayors of NYC as well as Manhattan Borough Presidents Scott Stringer, Ruth Messinger and Gale Brewer. Other supporters include Representatives Charles Rangel, Carolyn Maloney, and Jerrold Nadler; state legislator Dan O’Donnel; NYC Parks Commissioner Adrian Benepe; NYC councilors and community boards; and legendary folk singer Pete Seeger, who co-wrote the "Shorewalkers' Saunter Song".

The walk originally started at the South Street Seaport., but the area was damaged during Hurricane Sandy in 2012. The Great Saunter now starts and finishes at Fraunces Tavern.

In 2018 about 1700 people participated in the Great Saunter.

The Great Saunter was first explored and walked by Shorewalkers founder Cy A Adler in 1984. Adler wrote a book about this called Walking Manhattan’s Rim, the Great Saunter, published by Green Eagle Press. In 1984 the first walk had only a few people who had to climb fences and go through holes along the deteriorating waterfront which had lost much of its shipping due to the Container Revolution. Because of the publicity and visibility of The Great Saunter, the Manhattan waterfront has been gifted a number of improvements: new parks such as the Hudson River Park and Riverside Park South, and the refurbishment of East River Park, Riverside Park, Inwood Hill Park and others parks along the shore.

See also
Triple Crown of Open Water Swimming

External links
 Shorewalkers New York
 How to make this the year you really do the Great Saunter

References 

Hiking trails in New York City
Manhattan Waterfront Greenway
Tourist attractions in Manhattan
Circumnavigations of Manhattan